Kenneth Bager (born March 6, 1962) is a Danish musician and record producer.

History
Bager started his musical career back in the mid-1980s as a DJ. In 1994, he released a compilation called Music for Dreams featuring, among others, Peter Gabriel and Michael Nyman. Bager received his breakthrough with the release of his critically acclaimed debut album Fragments from a Space Cadet in 2006, for which he received the Danish Statens Kunstfond award. In 2007, Bager was amongst the performers at the annual Roskilde Festival. From 2010 onwards, he released his work under the moniker "The Kenneth Bager Experience".

Discography
1994 - Music for Dreams
2006 - Fragments from a Space Cadet
2010 - Fragments from a Space Cadet 2
2010 - Naked Music Remix EP (5 different versions)
2010 - Fragment 14 - Naked Music Remix EP (incl. remixes by Peter Zohdy, Kottarashky and others)
2010 - I Can't Wait Remix EP #1
2010 - I Can't Wait Remix EP #2
2011 - The Sound of Swing (Oh Na Na)
2012 - The Sound Of...

References

External links 
IMDb Kenneth Bager - Biography
Kenneth Bager's Facebook
 

1962 births
Living people
Danish electronic musicians
Danish record producers